The 1944 Washington gubernatorial election was held on November 7, 1944. Democratic nominee Monrad Wallgren defeated incumbent Republican Arthur B. Langlie with 51.51% of the vote.

Primary elections
Primary elections were held on July 11, 1944.

Candidates 
Arthur B. Langlie, incumbent Governor
Monrad Wallgren, incumbent United States Senator
Louis A. Wasmer
Marius Rasmussen
Charles A. DeBolt

Results

General election

Candidates
Major party candidates
Monrad Wallgren, Democratic
Arthur B. Langlie, Republican 

Other candidates
Allen Emerson, Prohibition
Henry E.O. Gusey, Socialist Labor

Results

References

1944
Washington
Gubernatorial